Pseudopanax crassifolius, the horoeka or lancewood, is a New Zealand native tree belonging to the family Araliaceae. It is found throughout New Zealand from sea level up to about 750 m. The juvenile form, which lasts for between 15 and 20 years, is very easily recognized.  The leaves are stiff and leathery with a prominent central rib, about 1 cm wide and up to 1 m long with irregular teeth, all growing downwards from a central stem. The young trunk has characteristic vertical swollen ridges. As the tree gets older the stem begins to branch, producing a bushy top, and the leaves become wider and shorter, losing their teeth. It is only when the tree is mature that it adopts a typical tree shape.

One of the theories about this curious change of appearance is that the young plant had to protect itself against browsing by the moa, the giant flightless bird that roamed New Zealand's bush in prehistoric times. Once above moa height, it was out of danger and turns into a "regular" tree. A study of leaf colour development in P. crassifolius found that leaves of seedlings would blend with leaf litter, while juvenile leaf colouration would draw attention to their spines. A closely related Chatham Island species, which evolved in the absence of moa, did not display these changes.

Closely related is Pseudopanax ferox, the toothed lancewood.  It is similar to P. crassifolius except the leaves are more abundant and severely toothed, resembling remotely a bandsaw blade.

References
 Salmon J T, The Native Trees of New Zealand, AH & AW Reed Ltd, Wellington, New Zealand, 1973. .

External links
Flora of New Zealand, URL:Pseudopanax crassifolius.
New Zealand Plant Conservation Network, Pseudopanax crassifolius.

crassifolius
Trees of New Zealand
Trees of mild maritime climate